is a mixed-media project produced by CyberAgent and DMM Games about girls playing ice hockey. An anime television series produced by CAAnimation and C2C aired from October to December 2021, while a mobile game developed by EXNOA was released in March 2022.

Characters

Nikkō Dream Monkeys

"Newcomer Set"

Left wing forward for the Dream Monkeys. Her family runs an inn, and she is a member of her school's embroidery club. She becomes inspired to take up ice hockey after coming across a poster advertising it in her school.

Center for the Dream Monkeys; captain of the team. She initially wanted to quit playing ice hockey, but was convinced to pick up the sport again by the Dream Monkeys.

Right wing forward for the Dream Monkeys. She transfers to Manaka's school initially to avoid playing ice hockey at her former school, only to be lured into returning to the sport.

Manaka's younger sister; left defenceman for the Dream Monkeys. She also serves as the team's mascot.

Right defenceman for the Dream Monkeys.

Goaltender for the Dream Monkeys.

"Senior Set"

Left wing forward for the Dream Monkeys.

Center for the Dream Monkeys.

Right wing forward for the Dream Monkeys.

Left defenceman for the Dream Monkeys.

Right defenceman for the Dream Monkeys.

Goaltender for the Dream Monkeys.

"Staff"

Coach for the Dream Monkeys. She aims to combine ice hockey and idols in order to increase the sport's popularity.

Assistant for Yōko Matsunaga.

Kushiro Snow White

Left wing forward for the Snow White.

Center for the Snow White.

Right wing for the Snow White.

Left defenceman for the Snow White.

Right defenceman for the Snow White.

Goaltender for the Snow White.

A Canadian girl who plays center for the Snow White.

West Tokyo Ice Rabbits

Left wing forward for the Ice Rabbits. She was a schoolmate of Manaka and the others, but transferred.

Media

Anime
In December 2020, an anime television series produced by CAAnimation and animated by C2C was announced. The series was directed by Takebumi Anzai, with Touko Machida in charge of series composition, Kii Tanaka designing characters based on Craft Egg's original designs, Takashi Murakami and Hiroshi Takita served as producers, and MONACA and Yōhei Kisara composing the series' music. Funimation licensed the series outside of Asia. Medialink licensed the series in Southeast Asia, South Asia, Micronesia, and Polynesia. It aired from October 6 to December 22, 2021 on Tokyo MX and other networks. The seven main cast members, under the name "Smile Princess", performed the series' opening theme song "Fire Fight!", while May'n performed the series' ending theme song "Orange." 

The English dub was released on December 30, 2022.

Episode list

Game
A smartphone application game, titled , was developed by EXNOA. It was released on March 15, 2022 for Android, iOS, and PC via DMM Game Player. The game ended service on November 30, 2022.

Reception
The anime series' first episode garnered poor reviews from Anime News Network's staff during the Fall 2021 season previews. Richard Eisenbeis felt "utterly shattered" by the premiere's mixture of idol and sports anime elements through "real world logic", saying that all-girl slice-of-life fans will enjoy it more than him. Caitlin Moore was also baffled by the series' opening and found the idol angle insulting for infringing on the ice hockey segments. Nicholas Dupree commended the production values of the hockey and idol parts in the beginning, but felt the premiere stretched itself too thin by trying to appease to both genres and lacked characters for viewers to care about, saying "the overall show feels stitched together by a marketing department trying to build a money printer out of spare parts." Rebecca Silverman criticized the episode for not showcasing enough ice hockey scenes for its intended audience and found framing issues when utilizing idol elements throughout the sports segments. Fellow ANN editor Christopher Farris reviewed the complete anime series in 2022 and gave it a B– grade. While praising the engaging story for developing its cast and showcasing ice hockey with appealing presentation, he felt the technical aspects of the sport were "incidental" and "surface-level" because of "languid pacing" and both the slice-of-life and idol elements being prioritized more than the overall narrative, concluding that: "It definitely still isn't the hockey anime a lot of people were hoping for, but it is more of a hockey anime than those initial visions of girls breaking out into dance numbers indicated, and ends up decidedly working better as a sports show than a lot of the other let-downs out there."

Notes

References

External links
Official website 

2021 anime television series debuts
2022 video games
Android (operating system) games
C2C (studio)
Crunchyroll anime
Ice hockey television series
Ice hockey video games
IOS games
Japan-exclusive video games
Mobile games
School life in anime and manga
Sports anime and manga
Tokyo MX original programming
Video games developed in Japan
Windows games